The Hit Network is an Australian commercial radio network owned and operated by Southern Cross Austereo. The network consists of 41 radio stations broadcasting a hot adult contemporary music format, as well as 6 digital radio stations.

History
The Hit Network was formed in 1986 as the Austereo Network after Austereo, the licensee of Adelaide commercial radio station SAFM, purchased Fox FM in Melbourne. The network grew throughout the late 1980s and the 1990s, acquiring B105 Brisbane, 2Day FM Sydney and PMFM Perth, as well as establishing joint-venture stations in Canberra and Newcastle. The network would later become known as the Today Network, with stations adopting a contemporary hit radio music format.

Following the acquisition of Austereo by Southern Cross Media Group, the company incorporated the regional Hot FM, Sea FM and Star FM networks into the Today Network.

In October 2014, Southern Cross Austereo announced it would relaunch SAFM in Adelaide as Hit 107, with a staggered network-wide relaunch announced in December. On 14 January 2015, the network was relaunched as Today's Hit Network, with the relaunch extending to Canberra in January 2016. Sea FM Hobart was relaunched as Hit100.9 in February, with the remaining network stations adopting the Hit Network branding as part of a national brand consolidation in December.

On 27 July 2020, the Hit Network was relaunched, adopting a new logo and "pop-based" music format in an attempt to target a 30–54 year old audience. In addition, Hit 105 Brisbane and Hit 107 Adelaide reverted to their heritage brands B105 and SAFM respectively. On 20 August 2020, Southern Cross Austereo announced the network would introduce statewide networked breakfast programs in New South Wales, Queensland and Victoria, replacing 19 local shows.

On 1 December 2020, Mix 94.5 Perth switched affiliation from the Triple M network to the Hit Network, with Hit92.9 relaunching as 92.9 Triple M.

Stations
, the Hit Network consists of 41 FM radio stations.

ACT
 Hit104.7 Canberra

NSW
 2Day FM 104.1 Sydney
 Hit101.3 Central Coast
 Hit105.9 Central West
 Hit105.5 Coffs Coast
 hit102.3 & 105.1 Mid North Coast
 Hit106.9 Newcastle
 Hit93.1 Riverina
 Hit99.7 Riverina MIA
 Hit104.9 The Border

QLD
 B105 Brisbane
 Hit103.5 Cairns
 Hit Central Queensland
 Hit100.7 Darling Downs
 Hit94.7 Emerald
 Hit101.9 Fraser Coast
 90.9 Sea FM Gold Coast
 Hit100.3 Mackay & the Whitsundays
 hit Maranoa
 Hit102.5 Mount Isa
 Hit89.1 South Burnett
 Hit97.9 Tablelands
 Hit103.1 Townsville

SA
 SAFM 107.1 Adelaide
 SAFM 96.1 Limestone Coast

TAS
 Hit100.9 Hobart

VIC
 101.9 The Fox Melbourne
 Hit91.9 Bendigo
 hit Goulburn Valley
 Hit99.5 Sunraysia

WA
 Mix 94.5 Perth
 Hit95.3 Albany
 Hit101.3 Broome
 Hit99.7 Carnarvon
 Hit102.3 Esperance
 Hit96.5 Geraldton
 Hit97.9 Kalgoorlie
 Hit106.5 Karratha
 Hit Northwest
 Hit91.7 Port Hedland
 Hit Southwest
 Hit Wheatbelt

Network shows
Carrie & Tommy
Hughesy, Ed & Erin
Hot Nights with Abbie Chatfield
Jimmy & Nath 
Jimmy & Nath Up Early
The Saturday Night Party Playlist

Digital radio
, the Hit Network broadcasts an additional 6 radio stations on DAB+ digital radio and the LiSTNR app.

Choose The Hits was a station only broadcast on digital radio and ran between 1 February 2010 and 24 May 2010.

The Hit Network launched Caravan Radio on 24 May 2010. It was a "pop up" Digital Radio station that played the best bits from Hamish & Andy's Caravan of Courage journeys while they toured the United Kingdom on their fourth Caravan of Courage.

See also
List of radio stations in Australia

References

External links
Hit Network

Australian radio networks
Hot adult contemporary radio stations in Australia